Trigana Air (registered as Trigana Air Service) is an airline based in Jakarta, Indonesia.

History

The company commenced operations in early 1991 with two Beechcraft King Air 200 fixed-wing aircraft, and by the end of that year had added two licence-built Bell 412SP helicopters. They also operated two ATR aircraft for Hainan Airlines from Sanya to Haikou and Hanoi until 2016.

In March 2021, the company announced a partnership with J&T Express. It was also said that J&T Express would use some of the airplanes owned by Trigana Air for its operations.

Destinations
Trigana Air flies to 20 destinations throughout Indonesia.

Ambon – Pattimura Airport
Biak – Frans Kaisiepo International Airport
Bula – Kufar Airport
Dekai – Nop Goliat Dekai Airport
Jakarta – Soekarno-Hatta International Airport, base
Jakarta – Halim Perdanakusuma International Airport
Jayapura – Sentani Airport
Merauke – Mopah International Airport
Moa – Jos Orno Imsula Airport
Nabire – Nabire Airport
Namrole – Namrole Airport
Oksibil – Oksibil Airport
Pangkalan Bun – Iskandar Airport
Semarang – Achmad Yani International Airport
Serui – Stevanus Rumbewas Airport
Sanana – Emalamo Airport
Surabaya – Juanda International Airport
Tanah Merah – Tanah Merah Airport
Ternate – Sultan Babullah Airport
Wamena – Wamena Airport

Fleet

Current fleet
 
The Trigana Air fleet consisted of the following aircraft (as of March 2022):

Former fleet
The airline previously operated the following aircraft (as of May 2022): 
7 ATR 42
3 ATR 72
4 Boeing 737-200
3 Boeing 737-300
1 Boeing 737-400

EU aviation blacklist

Trigana Air was once banned from operating in European Union airspace. The ban was imposed on all Indonesian airlines (by now several have been exempted) by the European Commission in 2007 in consultation with member states' aviation authorities. The ban was lifted in 2018 along with that for all other Indonesian airlines.

Accidents and incidents
Aircraft operated by Trigana Air have been involved in 14 serious incidents, 10 of which resulted in hull loss.
 On 21 April 2002, a Trigana Air Antonov An-72, registered as ES-NOP, was carrying out a chartered cargo service from Sentani Airport, Jayapura to Wamena Airport. The plane was carrying four people: a Lithuanian pilot, Estonian co-pilot, Russian flight engineer, and a loadmaster (nationality undetermined). While landing in Wamena, the front compartment of the Antonov An-72 suddenly caught fire. All aboard were evacuated safely from the plane.
On 25 May 2002, a de Havilland Canada DHC-6 Twin Otter registered PK-YPZ crashed in heavy rain whilst carrying supplies for the local town. All four passengers and both crew members died.
On 11 February 2010, Trigana Air Flight 162, operated by an ATR 42-300 registered PK-YRP, force landed in a paddy field near Balikpapan after both engines failed in-flight. All 52 passengers and crew on board survived.
On 8 April 2012, a DHC-6 Twin Otter carrying eight passengers and crew had several shots fired at it whilst landing at Mulia Airport in Papua province on a flight from Nabire. Both pilots received injuries which led them to lose control of the aircraft, which veered into an airport building. Of the eight passengers and crew aboard, one was killed and four were injured.
On 16 August 2015, Trigana Air Flight 267, operated by an ATR 42-300 registered PK-YRN, lost contact just before 3pm local time after taking off from Sentani airport in Papua's capital Jayapura on a flight to Oksibil. Its wreckage was found by villagers in the Bintang highlands region of Oksibil. All 49 passengers and five crew members were killed in the accident. The NTSC released their report 2 years and 5 months after the crash, and stated that pilot error and the failure of the ground proximity warning system were the causes.
On 13 September 2016, Trigana Air Flight 7321, registration PK-YSY performing flight IL-7321, operating a flight from Sentani Airport in Jayapura, made a hard landing on runway 15 at Wamena Airport, breaking both main gears. The aircraft slid to a stop on the runway, coming to rest partially on the grass. Nobody was hurt.
On 20 March 2021 a Boeing 737-400, registration PK-YSF, had a landing gear issue while departing from Halim Perdanakusuma International Airport. When attempting to make an emergency landing, the landing gear collapsed, causing significant damage, and the plane skidded off the runway.

Safety
On January 3, 2018, Trigana Air was awarded the dubious title of the worst in airline safety with a one-star rating out of seven by Airlines Ratings. The other airlines rated worst were North Korea's Air Koryo, Suriname's Blue Wing Airlines and Nepal's Buddha Air, Nepal Airlines, Tara Air and Yeti Airlines.

References

Airlines of Indonesia
Airlines established in 1991
Airlines formerly banned in the European Union
Indonesian companies established in 1991